Solomon Hutcherson (born August 13, 1972) is an American professional mixed martial arts fighter currently competing in the Middleweight division. He was a contestant on The Ultimate Fighter 3, and has competed for the UFC and MFC.

Background
Hutcherson was born and raised Racine, Wisconsin and attended Racine Park High School, where he competed in wrestling and qualified for the state tournament in his sophomore, junior, and senior years. In his senior year, Hutcherson placed sixth in the state and continued his career at Triton College in River Grove, Illinois but dropped out when his daughter was born.

Mixed martial arts career

The Ultimate Fighter

During The Ultimate Fighter 3 Hutcherson trained under Ken Shamrock's team. He kicked off a good relationship with Kendall Grove, forming "Team Dagger", although they were in different teams.

After losing the fight with Rory Singer he stated “You always end up learning from a loss. I had never gone into any of my prior fights taking things so personally. I was in the position of living out a dream. I have been watching the UFC ever since I was a kid. I finally had the chance to get inside the Octagon. That really got to me on an emotional level.” 
After the TUF show, he trained with Kendall Grove in the Xtreme Couture Camp for two years.

Other Competitions
At the "Xtreme MMA 5" event, Hutcherson met David Loiseau. During the final round, Solomon was knocked out by repeated knee strikes to the head, in a Muay Thai clinch.

Maximum Fighting Championship
Hutcherson fought Jason MacDonald at Maximum Fighting Championship event in December 2009, losing by split decision.

Nearly a year later, Hutcherson returned to Maximum Fighting Championship and faced David Heath at MFC 26: Retribution. Hutcherson lost via KO in the second round.

Mixed martial arts record

|-
| Loss
| align=center| 11–7 (1)
| David Heath
| KO (superman punch)
| MFC 26: Retribution
| 
| align=center| 2
| align=center| 3:46
| Enoch, Alberta, Canada
| 
|-
| Loss
| align=center| 11–6 (1)
| Jason MacDonald
| Decision (split)
| MFC 23
| 
| align=center| 3
| align=center| 5:00
| Edmonton, Alberta, Canada
| 
|-
| Win
| align=center| 11–5 (1)
| Dave Mewborn
| Decision (unanimous)
| MFC 20
| 
| align=center| 3
| align=center| 5:00
| Enoch, Alberta, Canada
| 
|-
| Loss
| align=center| 10–5 (1)
| David Loiseau
| TKO (knees)
| XMMA 5 - It's Crow Time
| 
| align=center| 5
| align=center| 1:56
| Montreal, Quebec, Canada
| 
|-
| Win
| align=center| 10–4 (1)
| Marcus Hicks
| TKO (punches)
| TFC 3 - This Means War
| 
| align=center| 1
| align=center| 1:29
| Edmonton, Alberta, Canada
| 
|-
| Win
| align=center| 9–4 (1)
| George Allen
| TKO (corner stoppage)
| ISCF - Unleashed
| 
| align=center| 1
| align=center| 4:55
| North Carolina, United States
| 
|-
| Win
| align=center| 8–4 (1)
| Nabil Khatib
| Submission (injury)
| HCF - Hardcore Championship Fighting
| 
| align=center| 2
| align=center| 4:34
| Enoch, Alberta, Canada
| 
|-
| Win
| align=center| 7–4 (1)
| Anthony Trotter
| TKO (punches)
| MMA BigShow - Domination
| 
| align=center| 1
| align=center| 4:18
| Cincinnati, Ohio, United States
| 
|-
| Loss
| align=center| 6–4 (1)
| Luigi Fioravanti
| KO (punch)
| The Ultimate Fighter: Team Ortiz vs. Team Shamrock Finale
| 
| align=center| 1
| align=center| 4:15
| Las Vegas, Nevada, United States
| 
|-
| Win
| align=center| 6–3 (1)
| Kyle Olsen
| Submission (rear-naked choke)
| FCC 18 - Freestyle Combat Challenge 18
| 
| align=center| 1
| align=center| N/A
| Racine, Wisconsin, United States
| 
|-
| Win
| align=center| 5–3 (1)
| Bobby Garrits
| Decision (unanimous)
| FCC 16 - Freestyle Combat Challenge 16
| 
| align=center| 2
| align=center| 5:00
| Racine, Wisconsin, United States
| 
|-
| Win
| align=center| 4–3 (1)
| Rob Smith
| TKO (knees)
| FCC 14 - Freestyle Combat Challenge 14
| 
| align=center| 2
| align=center| 3:03
| Racine, Wisconsin, United States
| 
|-
| Loss
| align=center| 3–3 (1)
| Jorge Rivera
| KO (punches)
| USMMA 3 - Ring of Fury
| 
| align=center| 1
| align=center| 3:01
| Boston, Massachusetts, United States
| 
|-
| NC
| align=center| 3–2 (1)
| Jon Fitch
| No Contest
| HOOKnSHOOT - Boot Camp 1.1
| 
| align=center| 2
| align=center| N/A
| Evansville, Indiana, United States
| 
|-
| Win
| align=center| 3–2
| John Nashef
| Submission (punches)
| FCC 9 - Freestyle Combat Challenge 9
| 
| align=center| 1
| align=center| N/A
| Racine, Wisconsin, United States
| 
|-
| Loss
| align=center| 2–2
| Emyr Bussade
| Submission (rear-naked choke)
| HOOKnSHOOT - Absolute Fighting Championships 1
| 
| align=center| 1
| align=center| 2:51
| Ft. Lauderdale, Florida, United States
| 
|-
| Loss
| align=center| 2–1
| Rick Graveson
| Submission (rear-naked choke)
| FCC 8 - Freestyle Combat Challenge 8
| 
| align=center| N/A
| align=center| N/A
| Racine, Wisconsin, United States
| 
|-
| Win
| align=center| 2–0
| Joe Nye
| TKO (punches)
| USMMA 2 - Ring of Fury
| 
| align=center| 1
| align=center| 3:50
| Lowell, Massachusetts, United States
| 
|-
| Win
| align=center| 1–0
| Jason Allar
| Submission (rear-naked choke)
| FCC 7 - Freestyle Combat Challenge 7
| 
| align=center| 1
| align=center| 3:48
| Racine, Wisconsin, United States
|

References

External links

1972 births
Living people
American male mixed martial artists
Mixed martial artists utilizing collegiate wrestling
Mixed martial artists from Wisconsin
American male sport wrestlers